The Latin Archbishopric of Patras is the see of Patras in the period in which its incumbents belonged to the Latin or Western Church. This period began in 1205 with the installation in the see of a Catholic archbishop following the Fourth Crusade.

The Latin archbishop was the senior-most of the seven ecclesiastic barons of the Principality of Achaea, which comprised the entire Peloponnese. From the late 13th century, the archbishops also purchased the secular Barony of Patras from its holders, becoming the most important vassals of the entire principality. It had five suffragans, Andravida, Amyclae, Modon, Coron, and Cephalonia-Zante.

The archbishopric survived as a Latin residential see until 1430, when the city of Patras fell to the Byzantine Greeks of the Despotate of the Morea. From 1475 on, Latin archbishops continued to be appointed, but for them the bishopric was only a titular see. It continues to be included in the Catholic Church's list of such sees, but since the Second Vatican Council no new appointments of Catholic bishops of the see have been made.

Residential archbishops

Titular holders

References

Sources

External links 
 Patrae (Veteris), at catholic-hierarchy.org

 
Patras
Baronies of the Principality of Achaea
Former Roman Catholic dioceses in Greece
Medieval Achaea
Latin Archbishopric of Patras
Catholic titular sees in Europe
Patras